The Publicly Owned Enterprise (abbreviated VEB) was the main legal form of industrial enterprise in East Germany. They were all publicly owned and were formed after mass nationalisation between 1945 and the early 1960s, and the handing back in 1954 of some 33 enterprises previously taken by the Soviet Union as reparations.

The managing director of a VEB was called a plant or works manager (German: Werkleiter, Werkdirektor or Betriebsdirektor). He or she was assisted by the first secretary of the factory party organisation (Betriebsparteiorganisation) of the SED, and the chairman of the factory trade union (Betriebsgewerkschaftsleitung). Subordinate to them were roles such as "Chief Accountant" and "Technical Director".

VEBs were initially vertically integrated into units called Associations of Publicly Owned Enterprises (Vereinigung Volkseigener Betriebe, VVBs). A VVB existed in most major industries to consolidate production and reduce waste. They had all been replaced by 1979 with the VEB Kombinate, or VEB Group, which integrated the VEBs much more closely than the largely administrative VVBs. Under this system, the term 'Kombinate' was frequently dropped and the term "VEB" usually implied the group rather than the individual factory. The organisation of all state enterprises was the responsibility of the State Planning Commission.

VEBs often had company sports teams, and played an important role in the promotion of sports.

In 1989, VEBs employed 79.9% of the East German workforce. After German reunification and the introduction of the market economy in 1990, the ownership of around 8,000 publicly owned enterprises passed to Treuhand, the trust agency which oversaw the privatization of GDR state property.

An honorary name was frequently added to the firm's actual name, for example, VEB Kombinat Chemische Werke "Walter Ulbricht" Leuna. This was a socialist emulation incentive towards fulfillment and overfulfillment of production quotas. Many Germans, as a form of mild protest against the nationalization of private businesses, nicknamed the VEBs Vatis ehemaliger Betrieb, which translates to "Daddy's former business".

Examples

VEB Automobilwerk Eisenach
VEB BMK Kohle und Energie
VEB Braunkohlenwerk Gustav Sobottka Röblingen
VEB Deutsche Musikaliendruckerei
VEB Deutsche Schallplatten
VEB Deutsche Seereederei Rostock
VEB Elbewerften Boizenburg/Roßlau
VEB Fachbuchverlag Leipzig
VEB Fahrzeug- und Gerätewerk Simson Suhl
VEB Filmfabrik Wolfen
Hochseeschiffbau Mathias-Thesen-Werft Wismar VEB
VEB Jehmlich Orgelbau Dresden
VEB Lokomotivbau Karl Marx Babelsberg (LKM)
VEB Lokomotivbau Elektrotechnische Werke Hans Beimler Hennigsdorf (LEW)
VEB Meissen Porzellan
VEB Motorradwerk Zschopau
VEB Polytechnik
VEB Planeta
VEB Robotron
VEB Sachsenring Automobilwerke Zwickau
VEB Typoart
VEB Uhrenwerke Ruhla
VEB Verlag Technik
VEB Volkswerft (Stralsund)
Kombinat VEB Zeiss Jena

See also
Volkseigenes Gut
Landwirtschaftliche Produktionsgenossenschaft
New Economic System
Economy of East Germany

References

Sources
 
 

German words and phrases
Corporate law
Economy of East Germany
East German law

no:Volkseigener Betrieb